Armak is a rural locality (a selo) and the administrative centre of Armakskoye Rural Settlement, Dzhidinsky District, Republic of Buryatia, Russia. The population was 468 as of 2017. There are 4 streets.

Geography 
Armak is located 67 km west of Petropavlovka (the district's administrative centre) by road. Altsak is the nearest rural locality.

References 

Rural localities in Dzhidinsky District